Altovise Joanne Davis ( Gore; August 30, 1943 – March 14, 2009) was an American entertainer, best known for being Sammy Davis Jr.'s third wife.

Biography
Born in Charlotte, North Carolina, as Altovise Joanne Gore, she was raised in Brooklyn, New York. A life member of The Actors Studio, Gore worked during the 1960s as a chorus-line dancer in various musical shows both in London and on Broadway.

Her relationship with Sammy Davis Jr. started in 1968 while they were working in the same show. They were married in a Philadelphia courthouse by the Rev. Jesse Jackson on May 11, 1970, and adopted a son, Manny, in 1989.

Sammy Davis Jr. died from throat cancer on May 16, 1990, five days after their 20th wedding anniversary.

Television and film roles
In the 1970s and 1980s Altovise Davis made a few guest appearances in major TV series such as Charlie's Angels and CHiPs and minor roles in films such as Welcome to Arrow Beach (1974), Kingdom of the Spiders (1977), Boardwalk (1979), and Can't Stop the Music (1980).

Both she and her husband were frequent panelists on the 1970s television game show Tattletales.

Taxes
Long saddled with tax problems following the death of her husband, Altovise Davis was included in 2008 on the California Franchise Tax Board's list of the top 250 delinquent taxpayers, with $2,708,901.75 in unpaid personal income tax.

Death
She died of complications from a stroke on March 14, 2009, at age 65 in Los Angeles. She is interred in an unmarked grave at Forest Lawn Memorial Park in Glendale, California, next to her husband, Sammy Davis Jr.

Filmography

References

External links

1943 births
2009 deaths
Actresses from New York (state)
American female dancers
Dancers from New York (state)
American stage actresses
Fiorello H. LaGuardia High School alumni
People from Brooklyn
Actresses from Los Angeles
Burials at Forest Lawn Memorial Park (Glendale)
African-American actresses
Sammy Davis Jr.
African-American women musicians